Albertino Homem dos Santos Sequeira Bragança (born 9 March 1944 in São Tomé Island) is a Santomean politician who is member of the Force for Change Democratic Movement – Liberal Party (MDFM-PL), he was Defence Minister from 1991 to 1992 in the cabinet of Prime Minister Daniel Lima dos Santos Daio and Foreign minister from 1992 to 1994 during the Costa Alegre cabinet.

On 8 April 2002, he became member of the National Assembly and was reelected on 18 May 2006. He represented the constituency (electoral district) of Água Grande and was member of the Standing Committee of the National Assembly.

References

External links
Albertino Bragança at AfDevInfo, archived from the original on 20 May 2012
Albertino Bragança at rulers.org
Foreign Ministers of São Tomé and Príncipe

1944 births
Living people
People from Água Grande District
Defence Ministers of São Tomé and Príncipe
Foreign Ministers of São Tomé and Príncipe
20th-century São Tomé and Príncipe politicians
21st-century São Tomé and Príncipe politicians